A number of works have been based on, have been inspired by, or have alluded to the works of Spanish poet, playwright, and theatre director Federico del Sagrado Corazón de Jesús García Lorca.

Poetry

Novels

Musical works

Theatre, film and television
 Federico García Lorca: A Murder in Granada (1976) directed by Humberto López y Guerra and produced by the Swedish Television. In October 1980 the New York Times described the transmission of the film by Spanish Television in June that same year as attracting "one of the largest audiences in the history of Spanish Television".
 Playwright Nilo Cruz wrote the surrealistic drama Lorca in a Green Dress about the life, death, and imagined afterlife of García Lorca. The play was first performed in 2003 at the Oregon Shakespeare Festival. The Cruz play Beauty of the Father (2010) also features Lorca's ghost as a key character.
 British playwright Peter Straughan wrote a play (later adapted as a radio play) based on García Lorca's life, The Ghost of Federico Garcia Lorca Which Can Also Be Used as a Table.
 TVE broadcast a six-hour mini-series based on key episodes on García Lorca's life in 1987. British actor Nickolas Grace played the poet, although he was dubbed by a Spanish actor.
 Rukmavati Ki Haveli (1991) an Indian feature film directed by Govind Nihalani is based on Lorca's The House of Bernarda Alba.
 There is a 1997 film called The Disappearance of Garcia Lorca, also known as Death in Granada, based on a biography by Ian Gibson. The film earned an Imagen Award for best film.
 Miguel Hermoso's La luz prodigiosa (The End of a Mystery) is a Spanish film based on Fernando Macías' novel with the same name, which examines what might have happened if García Lorca had survived his execution at the outset of the Spanish Civil War.
 British Screenwriter Philippa Goslett was inspired by García Lorca's close friendship with Salvador Dalí. The resulting biographical film Little Ashes (2009) depicts the relationship in the 1920s and 1930s between García Lorca, Dalí, and Luis Buñuel.
American playwright Michael Bradford drama, Olives and Blood, produced by Neighborhood Productions at The HERE Art Center/Theatre, June 2012, focuses on the present day trouble one of the supposed murderers of Lorca.
 Blood Wedding is the first part of a ballet / flamenco film trilogy directed by Carlos Saura and starring Antonio Gades and Cristina Hoyos (1981).
 In a segment of the 2001 animated avant-garde film Waking Life, Timothy Levitch extemporizes on Lorca's poem Sleepless City (Brooklyn Bridge Nocturne).

Notes

References 

Federico García Lorca